Gordon Rowland (born September 1, 1930) is a two-sport national champion in soccer and Canadian football. He won the Challenge Trophy in soccer with Montréal Stelco and the Grey Cup in the Canadian Football League with the Winnipeg Blue Bombers.

In 1997 he was inducted into the Manitoba Sports Hall of Fame and Museum.

External links 
Gord Rowland’s biography at Manitoba Sports Hall of Fame and Museum

1930 births
Living people
Anglophone Quebec people
Canadian football linebackers
Soccer players from Montreal
Canadian football people from Montreal
Players of Canadian football from Quebec
Winnipeg Blue Bombers players
Manitoba Sports Hall of Fame inductees